Phil Tippett (born September 27, 1951) is an American movie director and Oscar and Emmy Award-winning visual effects supervisor and producer, who specializes in creature design, stop-motion and computerized character animation. Over his career, he has assisted ILM and DreamWorks, and in 1984 formed his own company, Tippett Studio. 

His work has appeared in movies such as the original Star Wars trilogy, Jurassic Park, and RoboCop. In 2021, he released his long-gestating stop-motion film Mad God, which was funded through Kickstarter and distributed by Shudder.

Early life
Tippett was born in Berkeley, California. When he was seven, Tippett saw Ray Harryhausen's special effects classic, The 7th Voyage of Sinbad, and his life's direction was set. Tippett completed a bachelor's degree in art at the University of California, Irvine, and went to work at the animation studio Cascade Pictures in Los Angeles.

Career

Stop motion 

In 1975, while still working at Cascade Pictures, Phil Tippett and Jon Berg were hired by George Lucas at Industrial Light & Magic to create a stop-motion miniature chess scene for the original Star Wars film. When Star Wars was being released on theatres, in 1977, Tippett was approached by Joe Dante and Jon Davison to create the fish for Roger Corman's Piranha. It was released in 1978, although Tippett was not credited in the film.

In 1978, Tippett headed the ILM animation department with Jon Berg for The Empire Strikes Back, released in 1980. For this film, Tippett co-developed the animation technique called go motion to animate the sinister AT-AT Imperial Walkers and the hybrid alien tauntauns. In 1981, Tippett continued using go motion for Dragonslayer, and received his first Academy Award nomination for the extraordinarily realistic dragon animation. By 1983, Tippett led the famed Lucasfilm creature shop for Return of the Jedi for which he was awarded his first Oscar in 1984.

In 1984, Tippett Studio was born when Tippett left ILM and set up a studio in his garage to create a 10-minute experimental film called Prehistoric Beast. The realism of the dinosaurs it depicted and the film's reflection of contemporary scientific theory led to the 1985 CBS animated documentary Dinosaur!. The next year, in 1986, Dinosaur! earned Tippett Studio its first award, a Primetime Emmy Award for Outstanding Special Visual Effects, for the animated dinosaur sequences.

In 1986, producer Jon Davison hired Tippett to create the animated robot sequences for RoboCop. The ED-209 stop-motion model was animated by Tippett but designed by Craig Hayes (also known as Craig Davies), who also built the full size models. As one of the setpieces of the movie, the ED-209's look and animated sequences were under the close supervision of director Paul Verhoeven, who sometimes acted out the robot's movements himself. ED 209 was voiced by producer Jon Davison. This project became the start of a long and successful collaboration between Davies and Tippett.

He also modeled the Dark Overlord creatures seen in Howard the Duck.

Computer generated effects
In 1991, Tippett was hired to create the dinosaur effects for the Steven Spielberg blockbuster Jurassic Park using his go motion technique made famous in the film Dragonslayer. However, Dennis Muren and his CGI team at Industrial Light & Magic created animated test footage of a T. rex that Spielberg loved.

When Tippett was told that Jurassic Park dinosaurs would be computer-generated, he was shocked, exclaiming "I've just become extinct", a line Spielberg borrows and uses in the movie. Far from being extinct, Tippett evolved as stop-motion animation gave way to computer-generated imagery or CGI. Because of Tippett's background and understanding of animal movement and behavior, Spielberg kept Tippett on to supervise the animation on 50 dinosaur shots for Jurassic Park. Tippett supervised both the Tippett Studio and ILM animators, resulting in realistic digital dinosaurs that breathe, flex, twitch and react. His effort earned him a second Oscar. 

Work done on Jurassic Park resulted in the development by Tippett Studio's Craig Hayes of the DID (Digital Input Device) which was pivotal in the transition from stop motion to computer generated animation in bringing creatures to life. Tippett is also the subject of a humorous internet meme regarding his credit in the film ("Dinosaur Supervisor"), which is displayed with the tagline "One job, Phil! You had one job!", implying that because he didn't supervise the dinosaurs properly, he was responsible for the on-screen deaths. Mashable interviewed Tippett in April 2014 about this meme, which he called "beyond silly" and "such a waste of time". 

In June 2015, after media attention due to his new credit of "Dinosaur Consultant" in Jurassic World and the ensuing deaths in the film, Tippett tweeted: "to be fair, there were a lot of dinosaurs. It was a large job."

In 1995, Tippett Studio was hired to create the giant, hostile alien arachnids in Paul Verhoeven's adaptation of Robert A. Heinlein's classic science fiction novel Starship Troopers. Tippett marshaled a team of 100 animators, model makers, computer artists and technicians and expanded his all-CGI facility. Because of the intensity of his involvement, and his ability to pre-visualize the hordes of teeming arachnids, Verhoeven has credited Tippett with co-directing the large-scale battle sequences for the film. The excellence of this work resulted in Tippett's sixth nomination in 1997 for an Academy Award.

During 1997–98, Tippett supervised animation and effects for Universal's Virus and Disney's My Favorite Martian. In 1998–99 he and Craig Hayes co-supervised the visual effects on Jan De Bont's The Haunting, for DreamWorks. Under Tippett and Hayes' lead, Tippett Studio created over 100 complex effects shots that expressed the horrific character of the house and the spirits that live there.

In 2000, Tippett joined director Ivan Reitman as the visual effects supervisor on the DreamWorks science fiction comedy Evolution. In just under a year, Tippett Studio designed, realized and animated over 17 extraterrestrial creatures in 175 shots.

Throughout 2001 and into 2002, Tippett changed direction to focus on developing and directing his own film. Tippett achieved this with Starship Troopers 2: Hero of the Federation, by partnering with his longtime associates, writer Ed Neumeier and producer Jon Davison, with whom he worked on the original Starship Troopers and Robocop.

Mad God 
In 1990, Tippett began work on an independent project entitled Mad God but during the rise of his studio, the project was dropped. In 2010, Mad God was brought back up, but Tippett did not have the budget for the film, so he started a Kickstarter with a goal of $40,000. On June 16, 2012, the project was successfully funded, exceeding the goal and obtaining $124,156. 

The film was first screened December 11, 2021 and continued screening through mid-2022. The film took 30 years to complete, and a year before it was finished, Tippett had a mental breakdown, causing him to be admitted to a psychiatric ward.

Awards

Selected filmography

References

External links 

 
 
 Tippett Studio
 StarWars.com Phil Tippett bio

Film producers from California
American film directors
American animated film directors
American animated film producers
American animators
1951 births
Living people
University of California, Irvine alumni
Special Achievement Academy Award winners
Special effects people
Visual effects supervisors
Best Visual Effects Academy Award winners
Best Visual Effects BAFTA Award winners
Industrial Light & Magic people